Starfire Sports is a multi-purpose stadium and sporting facility in Tukwila, Washington, United States. It is located on the banks of the Green River, just south of Seattle. The stadium is operated by the nonprofit corporation Starfire Sports and is home to several soccer and rugby teams. At the time of its opening, CEO Chris Slatt claimed it was "the largest synthetic-turf soccer complex in the U.S." 

Since 2008, the Seattle Sounders of MLS has had offices and training facilities at the complex, whose main stadium hosted the Sounders' 2008 season and has since staged the team's Lamar Hunt U.S. Open Cup matches. The Sounders' affiliate team, the Tacoma Defiance, played at Starfire from 2015 to 2017 and has returned for select games starting in 2022. The Sounders plan to leave the Starfire complex in favor of their upcoming facility at Longacres in nearby Renton, Washington, expected to be completed in 2024.

Starting in February 2023, Seattle-based OL Reign of the National Women's Soccer League will use the Starfire complex for training facilities as the complex's primary tenant, having previously played home games there for their 2013 season.

The Seattle franchise of Major League Rugby, the Seattle Seawolves, began play at Starfire Sports in spring 2018.

History
The site was formerly Fort Dent Park, operated by King County.  In addition to the existing grass soccer fields, the park included a cricket pitch and softball fields in the areas now occupied by artificial-surface soccer fields.  Severe budget cuts in 2002 led the county to schedule the closing of this park, among others, at the end of the year; however, parks located within municipal boundaries were offered to those cities.  That offer sparked the formation of Starfire Sports by Slatt, Steve Beck, and Mark Bickham, who negotiated a 40-year lease with Tukwila to allow them to build and operate the complex.  This would relieve the city of an estimated $500,000 in annual maintenance costs which would likely have caused it to refuse the county’s offer had Starfire not stepped in.  Starfire plans to cover operating and maintenance costs through user fees and advertising banners and hopes to retire the $10 million construction costs over the course of several years.

New construction included four lighted outdoor soccer fields with FieldTurf, including the stadium with its 2000-seat grandstand, along with the indoor facility.

Beginning in summer 2004, English Premier League powerhouse Manchester United offered training at Starfire as part of their Soccer Schools program.  This came to an end in December 2007. In the late 2000s, the complex was proposed as the site of a larger 28,000-seat venue that would host a Major League Soccer expansion team. Starfire was instead chosen as the training grounds for the expansion team awarded to Seattle Sounders FC.

The city of Tukwila still maintains a wooded part of the  site as a public park. An expansion was unanimously approved by city leaders in a public hearing at the beginning of 2008 for the offices and training facilities of Seattle Sounders FC.

International rugby

Facilities
Starfire features fields for indoor and outdoor soccer, and occasionally rugby union games, as well as a 4,500-seat soccer stadium previously used by the USL Seattle Sounders and Seattle Reign FC of the NWSL and now used by the MLS Seattle Sounders FC for US Open Cup matches, Seattle Sounders FC 2 of the United Soccer League, Seattle Sounders Women of the W-League, and Seattle Seawolves of Major League Rugby. It was also the home of Hibernian and Caledonian F.C. and FK Pacific of the Pacific Coast Soccer League. Additionally, the complex hosts the annual All Nations Cup. In 2004, the stadium field became only the eighth American artificial-surface pitch to earn "recommended" status by FIFA and was thereby sanctioned for international play.

The complex has an indoor facility which has two indoor soccer FieldTurf fields. It also hosts administrative offices, a Mad Pizza restaurant, and a game room for children.

The expansion undertaken by the complex in 2008 also included new fields along with a workout and fitness area for the Sounders FC, as well as offices for the coaching and technical staff. To retain its community-based programs and accessibility, these areas and the fields have some public access.

References

External links

Soccer venues in Washington (state)
Buildings and structures in King County, Washington
Tacoma Stars (2003)
Rugby union stadiums in the United States
Major League Rugby stadiums
Seattle Seawolves
OL Reign
Former National Women's Soccer League stadiums
2005 establishments in Washington (state)
Sports venues completed in 2005
USL Championship stadiums